Onthophagus gravis, is a species of dung beetle found in India, and Sri Lanka.

Description
This minute oval, very convex species has an average length of about 3.5 to 4 mm. Body dull sooty black. Head, pronotum, legs, and ventrum bright metallic green, golden-red, or coppery in color. Antennae, mouthparts and tarsi are reddish. Whitish setae found on the dorsum. Head flat and closely rugose. Clypeus sharply angular in the middle. Pronotum closely, finely, and evenly granular. Pygidium closely and deeply punctured. Male has broadly clubbed spur in the front tibia. But in female, the spur is slender and strongly curved.

References 

Scarabaeinae
Insects of India
Beetles of Sri Lanka
Beetles described in 1858